William Thornton (about 1622 – after 22 December 1708) was a planter and colonist in 17th–century Virginia. He was one of approximately thirty early Virginia colonists to progenerate descendants that through intermarriage would establish themselves as a political and social 'aristocracy' in America. Among his most notable descendants are U.S. Presidents James Madison and Zachary Taylor.

Life 
William Thornton was born about 1622 in England.  He died after 22 December 1708.

It is not known whom William married but references indicate  that Anne Alicia Bellington m. abt 1642 was his first wife with whom he had sons Luke (b 1642 Old Rappahannock Lunenburg V d. 1725) and Edward (b 1646 d 1703) and later married Elizabeth Rowland in 1648. No record from the 17th or 18th century of who his wife was has been found.

William Thornton steps onto the pages of history on 10 August 1642 when he is listed, among others, as a person transported by William Prior in a land grant to Prior located in Charles River Shire, Virginia.  This would indicate he arrived in Virginia before that date, possibly in 1641.

In 1641 Charles I had been king of England, Scotland, and Ireland for 16 years. He was struggling with the English Parliament and England was on the verge of a civil war that would last from 1642 to 1651.

In 1641 Virginia had been settled 34 years and had been a royal colony for 17 years. Shires later called counties as a form of government were introduced 7 years earlier, Charles River Shire, the location of William Prior's land grant, being one of the first eight shires created was on the northern frontier of Virginia. It was renamed York County in 1643.  The population of Virginia was estimated to be in 8,100 in 1640. Sir William Berkeley was appointed governor of Virginia in 1641. He would serve from 1641 to 1652 and then again from 1660 to 1677. Though appointed governor in 1641 he would not arrive in Virginia until 1642.

On 18 April 1644  the Powhatan Confederacy launched a coordinated attack on the settlements in Virginia killing around 400 colonists.  This attack was the beginning of the Third Anglo-Powhatan War that lasted until a peace treaty was signed and ratified in October 1646. That treaty gave the land north of the York River to the Indians and made it a felony for any Englishman to go north of the York River contrary to the terms of the treaty.

Shortly before the peace treaty was signed ending the Third Anglo-Powhatan War and four years after William Thornton was listed as a headright in William Prior's land grant, William Thornton agreed in York County Court on 11 May 1646 to care for the cattle of John Liptrott, until John came of age.

In 1646 the forces of Parliament defeated King Charles. He was beheaded three years later in 1649 and England was proclaimed a Commonwealth. In 1652 three Parliamentary commissioners arrived in Royalist Virginia. Virginia surrendered without firing a shot. The Interregnum lasted until Charles II was restored to the throne in 1660 and Virginia became a royal colony once again.

The prohibition of English settlement north of the York River only lasted three years. In October 1648 the House of Burgess passed an act allowing settlement north of the York River with an effective date of 1 September 1649. Colonists were allowed to apply for land grants immediately.  It was two months later on 21 December 1648 that Richard Lee was granted 1250 acres on the north side of York River.  Sometime before 16 February 1653 Lee assigned the northern portion of his grant to William Thorne [Thornton] thus it appears William Thornton moved north of the York River between 1 September 1649 and 16 February 1653.  This land is in present day Gloucester County, Virginia, on the south side of Bland Creek. Gloucester County was created in 1651 from York County.

It was on this parcel in Gloucester County that William would live until he moved to Stafford County, Virginia, between 23 April 1706  and 28 December 1708.  On 16 February 1665/6 William Thornton of Petsoe (Petsworth) Parish, Gloucester County, increased the size of his holdings when he received a grant of land for 164 acres on land joining the land where he lived. This is the first reference to Petsworth Parish that is known.

Even though he continued to live in Gloucester County, on 27 September 1673 William purchased land further to the west up the Rappahannock River in what was then Rappahannock County, Virginia, apparently to provide for his two younger sons.  William purchased 2000 acres in the freshes of the Rappahannock on the north side of the river from John Mott and George Mott.  That same day William, of Gloucester County, Virginia, gave James Kay a power of attorney to accept possession of the 2000 acres he had purchased from the Motts.  William gave this land on 16 July 1675 to his sons Francis and Rowland Thornton, if they had no heirs to his son William Thornton, if he had no heirs to Ester Thornton.  On 22 December 1708 William, “Late of the County of Gloucester and now of Stafford County,” gave a power of attorney to Jonathan Gibson to acknowledge the deed in Richmond County where the land was then located.

Bacon’s Rebellion in 1676 in Virginia.

William was a vestryman in Petsoe (Petsworth) Parish from 1677 to 1706.  He was listed as William Thornton, Senior, in the Petsoe Parish, Gloucester County, quit rent roll for 1704/5 as having 525 acres. On 23 April 1706 William asked for a "quietus" from serving as a vestryman. The vestry granted his request and appointed a new vestryman in his stead.  Sometime before 22 December 1708 William moved to Stafford County, Virginia. On that date William, “Late of the County of Gloucester and now of Stafford County,” gave a power of attorney to Jonathan Gibson to acknowledge a deed of gift for 2000 acres of land he had given to his sons in 1675. He had acknowledged the deed in Gloucester County Court, but wanted to record it in Richmond County where the land was then located.  This is the last record of William Thornton that has been found.

Family 

It is not known whom William married. He is known to be the father of at least three sons, William (1649–1727), Francis  (1651–1726) and Rowland (? – 1701).

Historical places and estates 
The following historic places are communities, estates, houses directly associated with Thornton descendants.

Ash Lawn–Highland, Avery Island, Louisiana, Belle Grove (Port Conway, Virginia), Bellair (Stafford County, Virginia), Ben Lomond Manor (Manassas, Virginia), Blandair, Blenheim (Albemarle, Virginia), Camden (Port Royal, Virginia), Castle Hill (Virginia), Cedar Creek and Belle Grove National Historical Park, Churchill Downs, Dodona Manor, Dr. Richard Thornton House, Fall Hill, Farley (Culpeper County, Virginia), Flagler Museum, Fredericksburg, Virginia, General George Patton Museum of Leadership, General George S. Patton Memorial Museum, Gloucester County, Virginia, Kenmore (Fredericksburg, Virginia), Locust Hill (Albemarle County, Virginia), Montpelier (Orange, Virginia), Montpelier (Sperryville, Virginia), Nanzatico (King George, Virginia), Northumberland House (Virginia), Norwood (Powhatan County), Orange, California, Oaken Brow (King George, Virginia), Ormsby (Caroline County, Virginia), Ravenwood (Blackstone, Virginia), Rippon Lodge, Roaring Spring (Gloucester, Virginia), Rolling Hill (Charlotte County, Virginia), Rokeby (King George, Virginia), Smith Tower, St. Julien (Spotsylvania County, Virginia), Thornhill (Forkland, Alabama), Thornton Gap, University of Virginia, Woodlawn (King George, Virginia).

The list above is compiled through reference with historic files of the Virginia Department of Historic Resources and/or through the available sources of the individual Wikipedia article.

Notable descendants of William Thornton 
Notable descendants of William Thornton: 

 Meriwether Lewis Anderson 
 Howard Randolph Bayne
 Kate Betts
 Julien Binford
 Theodorick Bland (judge)
 William Wallace Smith Bliss
 John A. Bridgland
 Francis T. Brooke
 Robert Brooke (Virginia governor)
 William Yancey Brown
 Aline B. Carter
 Lucian Howard Cocke
 Holmes Conrad
 William Clark
 Meriwether Lewis Clark, Sr.
 Meriwether Lewis Clark, Jr.
 George Fitzhugh
 Thomas Marsh Forman
 Thomas Walker Gilmer
 Presley T. Glass
 Andrew Glassell
 Susan Thornton Glassell
 William T. Glassell
 Albert Taylor Goodwyn
 George Hancock (Virginia politician)
 Lawrence W. I'Anson
 Abbot Kinney
 Charles Frederick Goodwyn Kuyk, Jr.
 Meriwether Lewis
 John Tayloe Lomax
 James Madison
 George C. Marshall
 Bijie Martin
 Riccardo Martin
 Charlie McDowell
 John Avery McIlhenny
 Walter Stauffer McIlhenny
 John A. McSparran
 George S. Patton
 George Patton IV
 John Benjamin Pryor
 Luke Pryor
 Gabriel Slaughter
 Mary Steenburgen
 Adlai Stevenson II
 Adlai Stevenson III
 Letitia Green Stevenson
 Lewis Stevenson
 David Hunter Strother
 Edith Taliaferro
 Lawrence Taliaferro
 Mabel Taliaferro
 John Taliaferro
 Walter R. Taliaferro
 Joseph Pannell Taylor
 Richard Taylor (general)
 Sarah Knox Taylor
 Zachary Taylor
 John T. Thompson
 Gen. Sir Charles Wade Thornton
 Lt. Francis Thornton
 James Innes Thornton
 James R. Thornton
 Presley Thornton
 William Thornton
 William Taylor Thornton
 George Troup
 Thomas Walker (explorer)
 Meriwether Lewis Walker
 Benjamin Franklin Washington
 John Thornton Augustine Washington
 Lawrence Berry Washington
 Edward H. Watson
 John Taylor Wood
 Stuart Taylor Wood
 Zachary Taylor Wood

The list above is compiled through reference with available genealogical resources from the Library of Virginia, Library of Congress, multimedia referencing through Ancestry.com and through internal Wikipedia cross-referencing.

References

American planters
First Families of Virginia
Political families of the United States
English emigrants
Virginia colonial people
1620s births
Year of death unknown